Pucagaga Punta or Pucagaga (possibly from Quechua puka red, qaqa rock, "red rock"; Spanish punta peak; ridge; first, before, in front of) is a mountain in the Cordillera Blanca in the Andes of Peru,  high. It is situated in the Ancash Region, Huaraz Province, Independencia District, northeast of Huaraz. Pucagaga lies south of Ranrapalca, next to Churup, northeast of it.

References

Mountains of Peru
Mountains of Ancash Region